Donald Evans was an American artist (1945–1977), who was known for creating hand-painted postage stamps (artistamps) of fictional countries. Evans died in a fire in the Netherlands in 1977.

While Evans initially painted postage stamps as a child, he returned to making them in 1971, shortly after graduating from Cornell University and training as an architectural designer with Richard Meier and Associates in New York City. During a six-year period from 1971 to 1977, he painted faux stamps issued by forty-two countries he conjured in his imagination.

To make his art, Evans usually traced each stamp design in pencil, then completed it with a No. 2 Grumbacher paintbrush, watercolor, and pen and ink.  To simulate stamp perforations, Evans pounded out a series of periods on an old typewriter.

Evans catalogued all of his creations in a book he called the Catalogue of the World, which resembled a stamp-collecting catalogue in layout and style.

Evans traveled widely during the six-year period in which he painted professionally, often renting small flats or staying with friends.  Given the tiny scale of his art, he could pack an entire gallery exhibition under his arm.  He enjoyed considerable success while he was alive, and had solo gallery shows in Amsterdam, London, New York City, Paris and Washington, D.C.

On April 29, 1977, Evans's Amsterdam apartment building caught fire. He did not escape. But after his death his reputation continued to grow, particularly after the publication of Willy Eisenhart’s The World of Donald Evans in 1980 (followed by a second edition in 1994). Several prominent critics and authors have admired Evans’s work, including Bruce Chatwin, Adam Gopnik and Nick Bantock.

Chatwin's admiration was effusive: "By common consent, the art of the drop-out generation is a mess -- and the art of Donald Evans is the antithesis of mess.  Nor is it niggling. Nor is it precious. Yet I can't think of another artist who expressed more succinctly and beautifully the best aspirations of those years:  the flight from war and the machine; the asceticism; the nomadic restlessness; the yearning for sensual cloud-cuckoo-lands; the retreat from public into private obsessions, from the big and noisy to the small and still."

Evans's stamps can be found in many museums and private collections.

Notes

Bibliography 
  Calvino, Italo "Stamps from States of Mind", Collection of Sand (Penguin Classics) 1984, Eng. trans. 2013.
  Chatwin, Bruce "The Album of Donald Evans," The New York Review of Books, Volume 28, Number 8 (May 14, 1981)
  Eisenhart, Willy The World of Donald Evans (Harlin Quist Books) 1980
  Gopnik, Adam On (Or, Rather, To) Donald Evans. (Tibor De Nagy Gallery) 1999.

External links

Artpool Hungary  (artistamp museum site featuring Donald Evans—also check out other Evans links at page's bottom)

American artists
1945 births
1977 deaths